The parishes of Jamaica are the main units of local government in Jamaica. They were created following the English Invasion of Jamaica in 1655. This administrative structure for the Colony of Jamaica developed slowly. However, since 1 May 1867 Jamaica has been divided into the current fourteen parishes. These were retained after independence in 1962. They are grouped into three historic counties, which no longer have any administrative relevance. Every parish has a coast; none are landlocked.

List

(1) The parishes of Kingston and Saint Andrew together form the Kingston and St. Andrew Corporation. 
(2) The parish of Kingston does not encompass all of the city of Kingston. Most of the city is in the parish of St. Andrew.

History

Early history
Following the English conquest of Jamaica the first phase of colonisation was carried out by the Army, with a system of Regimental plantations. These were drawn up on the southern flat lands, with the Regimental commanders charged with ordering their men to plant provisions.

In 1662 the first census was carried out. There were no parishes and the division of the island into ten districts.

Creation of the parishes

Under Governor Modyford the island was divided into precincts and parishes and he commissioned a map of the island featuring these. The first parishes were:

Saint Catherine
Clarendon
Liguanea (St Andrew)
Saint Thomas
Port Royal
Saint John
Saint David

By 1675, the following parishes had been added:

Vere (separated from Clarendon in 1673)
Saint George
Saint Thomas in the Vale
Saint Dorothy
Saint Ann
Saint Elizabeth
Saint James
Saint Mary

In 1677, An Act for Regulating the Parishes fixed the boundaries of each parish.

The Grant reforms

The crisis highlighted by the Morant Bay rebellion led to the dissolution of the House of Assembly of Jamaica, and the colonial administration being turned into a crown colony. John Peter Grant was appointed Governor arriving in August 1866, and he set about instituting a number of reforms, including the administrative framework of the parishes. He introduced the by which the 22 existing parishes to 14 through the A Law to Reduce the Number of Parishes (1867/No.20).
Parishes have been a feature of local administration in Jamaica since the island was captured by the English in 1655. The number has varied over time and some no longer exist having either been absorbed into or divided between neighbouring parishes. At the peak, 1841–1865, there were 22 (the current 14 plus those listed below).

The current set of parishes was established in 1866 with the elimination of the 8 listed below (roughly by county):

Surrey:
Port Royal (now divided between Kingston and Saint Andrew)
Saint George (now divided between Saint Mary and Portland)
Saint David (now part of Saint Thomas)

Middlesex:
Metcalfe (now part of Saint Mary)
Saint Dorothy (now part of Saint Catherine)
Saint John (now part of Saint Catherine)
Saint Thomas in the Vale (now part of Saint Catherine)note that the current Saint Thomas used to be named "Saint Thomas in the East" to differentiate between the two parishes at the time.
Vere (now part of Clarendon)

Counties of Jamaica

Jamaica is divided into three historic counties, though they have no administrative function today. They were established in 1758 to facilitate the holding of courts along the lines of the British county court system.

The three counties are named for the English historic counties of Cornwall, Middlesex, and Surrey. Cornwall County was named for being the westernmost county, just like its namesake. Middlesex County was named for its location on the middle third of Jamaica. Surrey County was named for the English county in which Kingston upon Thames is found, because Kingston was its county town.

See also
Government of Jamaica
ISO 3166-2:JM
List of Caribbean first-level subdivisions by total area

References

External links

 Jamaica Parishes, a concise description of the parishes in Jamaica.
 Maps of the parishes of Jamaica

 
Jamaica 1
Parishes, Jamaica
Jamaica geography-related lists
Jamaica, Parishes
Subdivisions of Jamaica